Hendrick Hudson may refer to:

 Henry Hudson (died 1611), English explorer named in Dutch sources as Hendrick Hudson
 USS Hendrick Hudson, an 1859 ship
 Hendrick Hudson Central School District, in Westchester County, New York
 Hendrick Hudson High School, in Montrose, New York 
 Hendrick Hudson Council, formerly a local council of the Boy Scouts of America now within Westchester-Putnam Council